Labergement-Sainte-Marie is a commune in the Doubs department in the Bourgogne-Franche-Comté region in Eastern France. In 2018, it had a population of 1,220.

Geography
It is dominated by the Bois de Ban and the forests of Fuvelle and Grande Côte.

History
The commune was formed from two former communes Labergement-Sainte-Marie and Granges-Sainte-Marie in 1972. Both took their names from the Cistercian abbey of Mont-Sainte-Marie.

Inhabitants are called Abergeurs (masculine) et Abergeuses (feminine).

Demographics

Tourism
The rich natural resources of the commune attract many visitors to the lakes and forests. There are numerous hotels, hostels, and furnished apartments available for the visitor, as well as a campground.

Transportation
The commune has a railway station, on the Dijon–Vallorbe line.

See also
 Communes of the Doubs department

References

External links

 Labergement-Sainte-Marie on the intercommunal Web site of the department 

Communes of Doubs